Tolokonnoye is a rural locality (a selo) in Belgorodsky District, Belgorod Oblast, Russia. The population was 68 as of 2010. There are 4 streets.

Geography 
Tolokonnoye is located 17 km southwest of Maysky (the district's administrative centre) by road. Solovyevka is the nearest rural locality.

References 

Rural localities in Belgorodsky District